The 2018–19 Biathlon World Cup – Mass start Women started on 23 December 2018 in Nové Město and finished on 24 March 2019 in Holmenkollen. It was won by Hanna Öberg of Sweden, with the defending titlist, Kaisa Mäkäräinen of Finland, finishing 21st.

Competition format
In the mass start, all biathletes start at the same time and the first across the finish line wins. In this  competition, the distance is skied over five laps; there are four bouts of shooting (two prone and two standing, in that order) with the first shooting bout being at the lane corresponding to the competitor's bib number (bib #10 shoots at lane #10 regardless of position in race), with the rest of the shooting bouts being on a first-come, first-served basis (if a competitor arrives at the lane in fifth place, they shoot at lane 5). As in the sprint and pursuit, competitors must ski one  penalty loop for each miss. Here again, to avoid unwanted congestion, World Cup Mass starts are held with only the 30 top ranking athletes on the start line (half that of the pursuit) as here all contestants start simultaneously.

2017–18 Top 3 standings

Medal winners

Standings

References

Mass start Women